Channel Lemon News was a Hindi-language 24/7 news television channel, owned by Lemon Limited.

References

Hindi-language television channels in India
Television channels and stations established in 2014
Hindi-language television stations
Television stations in Mumbai